The Carmi Times is an American daily newspaper published in Carmi, Illinois. In 1987, the paper was acquired by Hollinger. Former owner GateHouse Media purchased roughly 160 daily and weekly newspapers from Hollinger in 1997.

The daily newspaper covers the White County communities of Carmi, Grayville and Norris City. GateHouse also publishes a Weekly Times in Carmi, and the Norris City Banner weekly.

References

External links 
 
 GateHouse Media

Newspapers published in Illinois
White County, Illinois
Publications established in 1950
1950 establishments in Illinois
Gannett publications